Michael Nobel (born 1940) is a Swedish entrepreneur of Russian origin. He is a member of the Nobel family, a descendant of Ludvig Nobel, a former chairman of the Nobel Family Society (1995–2006), a co-founder and chairman of the Nobel Sustainability Trust Foundation. At present, Nobel serves on several international boards that focus on scientific, medical and charitable initiatives. He promotes energy efficiency and alternative energy technology.

Early life
A member of the Nobel-Oleinikoff branch of the Nobel family, Michael Nobel is the grandson of Marta Helena Nobel-Oleinikoff (née Nobel) and the great-grandson of industrialist and humanitarian Ludvig Nobel, the founder of Branobel and one of the world's richest men in his time. Ludvig was also the brother of Alfred Nobel, who invented dynamite and established five prizes in the family name. 

Michael Nobel has a lengthy educational background which began at Harvard Business School in Cambridge, Massachusetts. In 1967, Nobel completed his studies at the Graduate Institute of Communications in Stockholm. Years later, in 1979, Nobel obtained a doctorate in psycho-pedagogy at the University of Lausanne. His thesis evaluated the effectiveness of substance abuse prevention programs in Switzerland

Career
Nobel is a consultant on energy issues and gives regular keynote lectures on the subject . Also he is the current Chairman of Nobel Sustainability Trust Foundation.

Board memberships
Nobel is a chairman or board member of twelve international companies in diagnostics, treatment and information in the field of medicine, most notably as chairman on the Board of Directors, Governors or Scientific Advisors. Nobel is also serves on several not-for-profit organizations in youth education and development as well as founder and trustee of the Nobel Sustainability Trust Foundation- an organization that bestows scholarships , awards for sustainable energy discoveries and organizes conferences and symposiums in the same field.

Work history

MRI
In 1980, Nobel participated in the introduction of MRI, a field he worked in for 24 years. Magnetic resonance imaging (MRI) is a technique used in diagnostic imaging to create a detailed visual of internal structures. It provides contrast between the different soft tissues of the body making it especially useful in brain, muscles, heart, and cancer research.

Social medicine
Nobel has been a consultant to UNESCO in Paris and the United Nation’s Social Affairs Division in Geneva. He also worked for seven years as a researcher in social sciences at the Institute for Mass Communication at the University of Lausanne and at the Department of Social Psychiatry at the Institute of Social and Preventive Medicine in the field of primary drug abuse prevention.

Honors and awards
In 2007, Nobel received the International Order of Perfection, First Class in Moscow. Over the years, Nobel has received several international citations and awards for his work in the fields of medicine and conflict resolution. Dr. Michael Nobel has received an honorary doctorate from Soka University and an honorary professorship from the National Academy of Science of Azerbaijan. Michael Nobel also sits on a number of prominent international prize committees.

Nobel was awarded the Gandhi, King, Ikeda Award from Morehouse College in Atlanta in 2002. It had only been given once before, to Prince El Hassan Bin Talal of Jordan. In 2004, he became the Board of Trustees Citation Recipient from the Midwest Research Institute of Kansas City and was appointed foreign member of the Russian Academy of Natural Sciences. Nobel has also received the UNESCO medal for outstanding contributions to the cultural dialogue between nations. Two Rotary clubs, in Miami and Karlskoga, have appointed him honorary member and Rotary International has conferred on him the Paul Harris Fellowship Award.

Additionally, Nobel has received the keys to the city from not only one, but two Hollywoods — California and from Hollywood in Broward County.

Nobel was awarded the Gusi Peace Prize in 2010, an honor from the Philippines dedicated to "Excellence and distinction to individuals or groups worldwide who have distinguished themselves as brilliant exemplars of society or who contributed toward the attainment of peace and respect for human life and dignity."

References

Michael
Businesspeople from Stockholm
Swedish people of Russian descent
Living people
1941 births
Magnetic resonance imaging
Harvard Business School alumni
University of Lausanne alumni
Academic staff of Tokyo Institute of Technology